The Roman Catholic Diocese of Jiaying/Kayíng/Meizhou is a diocese of the Catholic Church which is headquartered in the city of Meizhou, in the ecclesiastical province of Guangzhou in China.

History
 February 20, 1929: Established as the Apostolic Prefecture of Jiaying 嘉應 from the Apostolic Vicariate of Shantou 汕頭
 June 18, 1935: Promoted as Apostolic Vicariate of Jiaying 嘉應
 April 11, 1946: Promoted as Diocese of Jiaying 嘉應

Leadership
 Bishops of Jiaying 嘉應 (Roman rite)
 Bishop Francis Xavier Ford, M.M. (April 11, 1946 – February 21, 1952)
 Vicars Apostolic of Jiaying 嘉應 (Roman Rite)
 Bishop Francis Xavier Ford, M.M. (June 18, 1935 – April 11, 1946)
 Prefects Apostolic of Jiaying 嘉應 (Roman Rite)
 The Rev. Francis Xavier Ford, M.M. (April 28, 1929 – June 18, 1935)

References

 GCatholic.org
 Catholic Hierarchy

1929 establishments in China
Christianity in Guangdong
Meizhou
Christian organizations established in 1929
Roman Catholic dioceses and prelatures established in the 20th century
Roman Catholic dioceses in China